American Glacier is located in the Bridger Wilderness of Bridger-Teton National Forest, in the U.S. state of Wyoming.

See also
 List of glaciers in the United States

References

Glaciers of Sublette County, Wyoming
Glaciers of Wyoming